Bucheon FMC Best WFC, full name Bucheon Facilities Management Corporation BEST Women's Football Club (Korean: 부천시 시설관리공단 BEST 여자축구단) is a South Korean women's football team based in Bucheon. Bucheon FMC Best was founded on March 3, 2010.

Defunct women's football clubs in South Korea
Women's football clubs in South Korea
Association football clubs established in 2010
Association football clubs disestablished in 2010
Sport in Gyeonggi Province
Bucheon
2010 establishments in South Korea
2010 disestablishments in South Korea